Giuseppe Dossena (born 2 May 1958) is an Italian football manager and former football player, who played as a midfielder. He played for several Italian clubs throughout his career, in particular Torino and Sampdoria, where he won several titles. At international level, he represented the Italy national football team, and was a member of the Italian squad that won the 1982 FIFA World Cup.

Club career
Dossena began his playing career for Torino in 1976, and moved to Pistoiese the following season. He subsequently played for Cesena and Bologna, before returning to Torino in 1981, where he remained until 1987; it was during this second spell with the club that he was a member of the Italy national team, even earning a call-up for the Italy squad at the 1982 FIFA World Cup. He then played for Udinese, Sampdoria and Perugia, where he retired in 1992. Dossena is mostly remembered for his time with Sampdoria, where he achieved notable domestic and international success, winning the 1988–89 Coppa Italia, the 1989–90 European Cup Winners' Cup, the 1990–91 Serie A title, and the 1991 Supercoppa Italiana, also losing out on the 1990 European Super Cup final to European Cup winners and Serie A rivals Milan.

International career
With the Italy national side, Dossena received 38 caps between 1981 and 1987, scoring 1 goal. After making 4 appearances in Italy's 1982 FIFA World Cup qualifiers, he was selected as a member of Italy's 1982 FIFA World Cup winning squad, although he was an unused substitute throughout the tournament, despite being given the number 10 shirt.

Style of play
Primarily a playmaker, Dossena was a hard-working, creative team player, renowned for his stamina, vision, technique, and passing ability in midfield, although he was also known for his ability to make attacking runs and strike from distance.

Managerial career
Later, he started a managing career at international level, coaching Ghana for two years (1998–2000), and then being assistant of Cesare Maldini in Paraguay's appearance at the 2002 FIFA World Cup. Between 2000 and 2001, he coached Ittihad Jeddah of Saudi Arabia. He later worked as an analyst for Italian public broadcasting company RAI.

In July 2002, Dossena was appointed the new manager of Albania national team, becoming the first foreigner manager of the team since Hungarian Miklós Vadas in 1953. His spell at The Red and Blacks lasted for only three months, during which he led the national team in only two matches: the first was a 1–1 draw against Switzerland and the second was the 4–1 loss to Russia. He also won an unofficial friendly match against Kosovo 1–0 in September. In November 2002, he asked for his resign via a letter directed to Albanian Football Association, citing the pressure from the local media as the main reason of his decision.

On 30 August 2010 it was revealed that Dossena had agreed a two-year contract with Ethiopian champions Saint George FC. He later worked as a sporting director. Now, he is an adviser for the Italy national football team.

Career statistics

International
Source:

Honours

Club
Sampdoria
Serie A: 1990–91
Coppa Italia: 1988–89
Supercoppa Italiana: 1991
European Cup Winners' Cup: 1989–90

International
Italy
FIFA World Cup: 1982

References

External links

1958 births
Living people
Footballers from Milan
1982 FIFA World Cup players
Atletico Roma F.C. managers
Bologna F.C. 1909 players
FIFA World Cup-winning players
Association football midfielders
Italian footballers
Italy international footballers
Italy under-21 international footballers
A.C. Perugia Calcio players
Serie A players
Serie B players
Serie C players
Torino F.C. players
U.C. Sampdoria players
Udinese Calcio players
U.S. Pistoiese 1921 players
A.C. Cesena players
U.S. Triestina Calcio 1918 managers
A.S. Sambenedettese managers
Albania national football team managers
A.S. Lodigiani managers
Ittihad FC managers
Ghana national football team managers
Saint George S.C. managers
Italian expatriate football managers
2000 African Cup of Nations managers
Expatriate football managers in Ghana
Expatriate football managers in Saudi Arabia
Expatriate football managers in Albania
Expatriate football managers in Ethiopia
Italian expatriate sportspeople in Albania
Italian expatriate sportspeople in Ethiopia
Italian expatriate sportspeople in Saudi Arabia
Italian expatriate sportspeople in Ghana
Italian expatriate sportspeople in Paraguay